The 1952 United States Senate election in Nebraska took place on November 2, 1952. The incumbent Republican Senator, Hugh A. Butler, was re-elected to a third term. He defeated Stanley D. Long. A special election to finish Kenneth S. Wherry's term was held on the same day. The independent candidate Dwight Dell also ran for the seat, despite acknowledging his slim chance of election. Butler performed on par with Dwight D. Eisenhower, who won the state with 69.15% of the vote in the presidential election.

Democratic primary

Candidates
Stanley D. Long, former mayor of Cowles, Nebraska

Results

Republican primary

Candidates
Hugh A. Butler, the incumbent Senator
Val Peterson, Governor of Nebraska

Results

Other candidates 
A petition to put Dwight Dell, the state director of the Christian Rural Overseas Program, onto the ballot were circulated by an anti-conscription campaign, known as the Committee to Elect Dell and Knowles, opposing its use in the Korean War. Dell promised to run only if the petition received over 5,000 votes. Dell ran as a pacifist, calling for a reduction in armaments.

Results

References 

1952
Nebraska
United States Senate